Shigonsky District is an administrative and municipal district (raion), one of the twenty-seven in Samara Oblast, Russia. It is located in the west of the oblast. Its administrative center is the rural locality (a selo) of Shigony. Population: 21,002 (2010 Census);  The population of the administrative center accounts for 23.7% of the district's total population.

References

Notes

Sources

Districts of Samara Oblast